Habenaria ochroleuca, commonly known as the sickle orchid or sickle habenaria, is a species of orchid that is endemic to northern Australia. It has two or three broad, glabrous leaves and up to twenty five white flowers on a flowering stem with many overlapping bracts. The side lobes of the labellum curve upwards.

Description 
Flowering occurs from January to March.

Taxonomy and naming
Habenaria ochroleuca was first formally described in 1810 by Robert Brown and the description was published in Prodromus Florae Novae Hollandiae et Insulae Van Diemen. The specific epithet (ochroleuca) is derived from the ancient Greek words  meaning "pale-yellow" and  meaning "white", referring to the colour of the flowers.

Distribution and habitat
The sickle orchid is found in the Kimberley region of Western Australia, in the northern parts of the Northern Territory and in New Guinea. It is common within its range in Western Australia where it grows in seasonally wet areas and on roadsides.

Conservation
Habenaria ochroleuca is classified as "not threatened" in Western Australia by the Western Australian Government Department of Parks and Wildlife.

References

Orchids of the Northern Territory
Orchids of Western Australia
Orchids of New Guinea
Endemic orchids of Australia
Plants described in 1810
ochroleuca